Caspar Dennis Shankly Hughes (born 9 June 1993) is an English footballer. He plays as a midfielder for Nantwich Town having started his career at Crewe Alexandra.

Career
Hughes was born in Crewe, Cheshire. He made his debut for Crewe Alexandra in the Football League Two game against Stockport County at the Alexandra Stadium on 30 April 2011, which ended in a 2–0 win for Crewe. He came on as a late substitute for Ashley Westwood. Hughes joined Chasetown of the Northern Premier League on a short-term loan on 6 January 2012, and joined their divisional rivals Nantwich Town on a month's loan on 2 March. He was released by Crewe at the end of the 2011/12 season, subsequently rejoining Nantwich Town on a permanent contract.

He started the 2013–2014 season with AFC Fylde who had gained promotion from the Northern Evostik Premiership. The club was in the English Conference North for seasons 2014-2015 and 2015-2016 where Hughes established himself as a right-back.

Hughes later rejoined Nantwich, and played in the side defeated by Fylde in the first round of the F.A. Cup in November 2019.

Career statistics

References

External links

1993 births
Living people
English footballers
Association football midfielders
Crewe Alexandra F.C. players
Chasetown F.C. players
Nantwich Town F.C. players
AFC Fylde players
English Football League players
National League (English football) players
Northern Premier League players
Sportspeople from Crewe